Crematogaster brunneipennis is a species of ant in tribe Crematogastrini. It was described by Andre in 1890.

References

brunneipennis
Insects described in 1890